Epirochroides hovanus is a species of beetle in the family Cerambycidae, and the only species in the genus Epirochroides. It was described by Fairmaire in 1904.

References

Crossotini
Beetles described in 1904
Monotypic Cerambycidae genera